Chandu (born Satti Chandra Sekhar Reddy, 17 October 1975) is an Indian film director, producer, and screenwriter who predominantly works in Telugu cinema. Born in Vedurupaka near Kakinada, East Godavari district of Andhra Pradesh, he studied at St.anns and S.K.V.T. high school in Rajahmundry.

Career
Chandu started his career as an assistant director for the feature film Kalyana Ramudu which was directed by "Chirunavvutho Ramprasad", and Samba directed by V. V. Vinayak. In 2005, producer Shyam Prasad gave Chandu his first directing opportunity with SP Entertainments's  film 10th Class. It was released in 2006 and was a success at the box office. Later, in 2007, his second directorial venture was the film Note Book. He launched the career of Rajeev (son of composer Koti). In 2013, Chandu wrote and directed Prema Oka Maikam.

Filmography
As director
 10th Class (2006) 
 Note Book (2007)
 Prema Oka Maikam (2013)

As assistant director
 Kalyana Ramudu (2003)
 Samba (2004)

References

1975 births
Living people
Film directors from Andhra Pradesh
People from East Godavari district